is a 1986 Japanese film directed by Kazuyuki Izutsu.

Awards
8th Yokohama Film Festival
Won: Best Actress - Narumi Yasuda
Won: Best Newcomer - Miki Imai
5th Best Film

References

1986 films
Films directed by Kazuyuki Izutsu
1980s Japanese-language films
1980s Japanese films